is a 1986 block breaker arcade game developed and published by Taito. In North America, it was published by Romstar. Controlling a paddle-like craft known as the Vaus, the player is tasked with clearing a formation of colorful blocks by deflecting a ball towards it without letting the ball leave the bottom edge of the playfield. Some blocks contain power-ups that have various effects, such as increasing the length of the Vaus, creating several additional balls, or equipping the Vaus with cannons. Other blocks may be indestructible or require multiple hits to break.

Created by Taito designers Akira Fujita and Hiroshi Tsujino, Arkanoid expanded on the concept established in Atari's Breakout, a successful game in its own right that was met with a large wave of similar clone games from other manufacturers. It was part of a contest within Taito, where two teams of designers had to complete a block breaker game and determine which one was superior to the other. The film Tron served as inspiration for the game's futuristic, neon aesthetic. Level designs were sketched on paper before being programmed and tested to make sure they were fun to play. The enemy and power-up designs were 3D models converted into sprite art.

Early location tests for Arkanoid surpassed Taito's initial expectations. It became a major commercial success in arcades, becoming the highest-grossing table arcade cabinet of 1987 in Japan and the year's highest-grossing conversion kit in the United States. The game was commended by critics for its gameplay, simplicity, addictive nature, and improvements over the original Breakout concept. The game revitalized the genre and set the groundwork for many games to follow. Arkanoid was ported to many home video game platforms, including the Commodore 64, Nintendo Entertainment System, ZX Spectrum, and (years later) mobile phones, and it spawned a long series of sequels and updates over the course of two decades.

Gameplay

Arkanoid is a block breaker video game. Its plot involves the starship Arkanoid being attacked by a mysterious entity from space named DOH. A small paddle-shaped craft, the Vaus, is ejected from the Arkanoid.

The player controls the "Vaus", a space vessel that acts as the game's "paddle" which prevents a ball from falling from the playing field, and attempts to bounce the ball against a number of bricks. The ball striking a brick causes the brick to disappear. When all the bricks are gone, the player advances to the next level, where another pattern of bricks appears. There are game variations (bricks that have to be hit multiple times, flying enemy ships, etc.) and power-up capsules to assist the player (expand the Vaus, multiply the number of balls, equip a laser cannon, break directly to the next level, extra Vaus, etc.), but the gameplay remains the same.

On the final stage (33 on most versions, but 36 on the NES), the player takes on the game's boss, "DOH." Once this point is reached, the player no longer has the option to continue after running out of lives, making this segment more difficult. The game is over regardless of the outcome.

If the player succeeds in defeating "DOH," the game rewards them by showing the ending, in which time starts to flow backwards, and Vaus escapes the distorted space just in time to return to the Arkanoid, which has also reversed back to perfect condition.  The game's text warns, however, that the journey has only started, and that the player hasn't seen the last of "DOH."

Development and release
Arkanoid was designed by Akira Fujita and Hiroshi "ONIJUST" Tsujino, both of whom were members of Taito's Yokohama Research Institute. The company's sales department requested a new block breaker arcade game due to the genre beginning to see an upturn in popularity, following a steady downfall in the early 1980s. This led to a competition being held within the company to design the new game which was jointly won by Fujita and Tsujino, who were then instructed to combine their ideas into a single project. The game builds on the overall block breaker concept established in Atari's Breakout, a widely-successful arcade game that spawned a long series of similar clone games by other manufacturers.

The development team consisted of Fujita in charge of planning, with Tsujino providing level design and graphics and two others programming the arcade board, a modified version of the Taito Classic hardware. The neon, futuristic aesthetic was inspired by the film Tron (1982), which Tsujino was a big fan of. Blocks originally never had colors and were simply the same color, which was changed to the minor annoyance of Tsujino. The various geometric-like enemies and power-up items were hand-drawn from 3-dimensional models before being converted into sprite art. Hisayoshi Ogura, the founder of Taito's "house band" Zuntata, created the game's music.

The game had a short development time with tight work deadlines, a schedule which Tsujino has since claimed to be "murderous". Location testing for the game began only a month after the start of development. It was incredibly well received by playtesters, and generated a lot more popularity and income than Taito had expected. Arkanoid was officially released in Japan in July 1986, and in North America later that year by distributor company Romstar.

Ports
Arkanoid was ported to the ZX Spectrum, Amstrad CPC, Commodore 64, BBC Micro, MSX, Atari 8-bit family, Apple II, NES, Amiga, Atari ST, Apple IIGS. and IBM PC. A Macintosh version was released in 1987 and a port was released for the Tandy Color Computer 3 in 1989. Computer conversions were published by Imagine. The NES and MSX ports were packaged with a custom controller.

Reception

Commercial
Arkanoid became one of Taito's most profitable coin-operated games. In Japan, Game Machine listed it as being the most popular arcade game of August 1986, and it remained the top-grossing table arcade cabinet for six months through September, October, November and December 1986, up until February 1987. Arkanoid was Japan's highest-grossing table arcade game during the second half of 1986, and the overall sixth highest-grossing table arcade game of 1986. It later went on to be the country's overall highest-grossing table arcade game of 1987.

In the United States, it was the highest-grossing arcade conversion kit of 1987. In the United Kingdom, it was the fourth highest-grossing arcade game of 1986 on London's Electrocoin charts. Euromax listed it as being the third most popular arcade game in Europe during 1987.

Critical
The arcade game was reviewed in Computer and Video Games by Clare Edgeley in November 1986, where she compared it to Pong and Space Invaders in its simplicity and addictiveness. She described Arkanoid as "a lovely game" that is "fast, colourful, simple and addictive".

The home versions were also well received. Computer Gaming World stated in 1988 that Arkanoid on the Amiga was "a perfect version of the arcade game ... incredible!" It named the NES version the Best Arcade Translation for the console that year, praising the graphics and play mechanics. The game was reviewed in 1989 in Dragon #144 by Hartley, Patricia, and Kirk Lesser in "The Role of Computers" column. The reviewers gave the game 5 out of 5 stars. Compute! named the game to its list of "nine great games for 1989", describing it as "hypnotic, addictive, and fascinating". Along with Breakout, the magazine noted Arkanoid also has elements of Pong and Space Invaders as well as Pac-Man in its use of power-ups.

Accolades
Arkanoid and its home releases received several awards, including the "Silver Award" from the Gamest Awards, "Games of the Year" from Compute! magazine, "Best Arcade Game" from the Entertainment Software Trade Awards, "Best Arcade Translation" from Computer Gaming World, and "Best Video/Computer Arcade Translation" (for the NES version) from VideoGames & Computer Entertainment. Arkanoid was the first game to enter the Popular Computing Weekly Hall of Fame, in 1987.

In 1997, Electronic Gaming Monthly editors ranked the NES version the 41st best console video game of all time, describing it as "the type of game that you'd pick up because you need a quick video game fix but would end up playing for hours". They particularly noted that despite the ability to shoot lasers, the game demanded a great deal of skill from the player.

Legacy
Arkanoid was followed by a number of direct and indirect sequels. Tournament Arkanoid  was released in 1987 exclusively in the United States by Romstar. Developed by Taito America rather than Taito Japan, it has the same gameplay as Arkanoid, but adds new levels.  Revenge of Doh, a true sequel with new gameplay mechanics, was released in arcades in 1987. Arkanoid: Doh It Again and Arkanoid Returns were published in 1997, followed by Arkanoid DS in 2007.

Arkanoid Live! was published as on May 6, 2009, for Xbox Live Arcade. The WiiWare game Arkanoid Plus! was released in Japan on May 26, 2009, PAL regions on August 21, 2009, and in North America on September 28, 2009. A version of Arkanoid for iOS was released in 2009.

The mashup Arkanoid vs. Space Invaders was released in 2017 for iOS and Android.

Arkanoid appears in Life Is Strange: True Colors.

A modernized version of the game, titled Arkanoid: Eternal Battle, was developed by Pastagames and published by Microids. It was released on October 27, 2022 for Nintendo Switch, PlayStation 4, PlayStation 5, Windows, Xbox One, and Xbox Series X/S. The original 1986 arcade version is included in this game.

Notes

References

External links

Arkanoid at the Amiga Hall of Light
Arkanoid for the Atari ST at Atari Mania

1986 video games
Amiga games
Amstrad CPC games
Apple II games
Apple IIGS games
Arcade video games
Atari 8-bit family games
Atari ST games
BBC Micro and Acorn Electron games
Breakout clones
Commodore 64 games
DOS games
Classic Mac OS games
MSX games
NEC PC-8801 games
NEC PC-9801 games
Nintendo Entertainment System games
PlayStation (console) games
Romstar games
Super Nintendo Entertainment System games
Square Enix franchises
TRS-80 Color Computer games
ZX Spectrum games
Video games scored by Hisayoshi Ogura
Video games scored by Martin Galway
Video games scored by Tsukasa Masuko
IOS games
Taito arcade games
NovaLogic games
Video games developed in Japan
Vertically-oriented video games